Levski Sofia is a Bulgarian professional association football club based in Sofia, which competes in the First League, the top division of the Bulgarian football league system. The club was founded on 24 May 1914 by a group of high school students, and is named after Vasil Levski, a Bulgarian revolutionary renowned as the national hero of the country.

Levski has won a total of 74 trophies, including 26 national titles, 26 national cups and 3 supercups, as well as 13 domestic Doubles and 1 Treble. It is also the only Bulgarian football club to have never been relegated from the top division since the establishment of the league system in 1937. Levski has reached the quarter-finals of UEFA competitions for five times, was runner-up of the Balkans Cup twice, and in 2006, it became the first Bulgarian club to reach the group stage of the UEFA Champions League.

The team's regular kit colour is all-blue. Levskis home ground is the Vivacom Arena - Georgi Asparuhov in Sofia, which has a capacity of 25,000 spectators. The club's biggest rivals are CSKA Sofia, and matches between the two capital sides are commonly referred to as the Eternal derby of Bulgaria. Levski also contests the Oldest capital derby with Slavia Sofia. The club is a regular member of the European Club Association and the European Multisport Club Association.

History

1914–1969: Sports Club Levski

Sports Club Levski was founded in 1911 by a group of students from the Second Male High School in Sofia. The club's name was chosen in honour of the Bulgarian revolutionary Vasil Levski, and the club was officially registered on 24 May 1914.

In 1914, Levski lost its first official match against FK 13 Sofia with the score of 2–0. Between 1914 and 1920, football wasn't a popular sport in Bulgaria, and no additional information about the club exists. In the summer of 1921, the Sofia Sports League was established, which united ten clubs from Sofia and marked the beginning of organized football competitions in the city. Levski won the first match in the championship in the 1921–22 season, held on 18 September 1921, against Atletik Sofia with the score of 3–1. The team captured first place in the league in 1923 after a 3–2 win over bitter rivals Slavia Sofia, and successfully defended the title the following season.

The first National Championship was held in 1924 with Levski representing Sofia. The team went on to win the title in 1933, 1937 and 1942, and established itself as the most popular football club in Bulgaria. In 1929, Levski became the first semi-professional football club in Bulgaria, after twelve players staged a boycott of the team in demand of financial remuneration and insurance benefits. The same year Levski met its first international opponents, losing to Gallipoli Istanbul 1–0 and winning against Kuban Istanbul 6–0. Between 1930 and 1932, Levski won the Ulpia Serdica Cup for three consecutive years and was permanently awarded the trophy as a result.

After World War II, Levski became one of the two top clubs in Bulgaria. After winning the championship in 1946, 1947, 1949, 1950 and 1953, Levski would not capture the domestic title again until the mid-1960s. In 1949, the authorities changed the club's name to Dinamo following the Soviet traditions, but after the de-Stalinization of Bulgaria, it was reverted in 1957. The 1960s were marked with return to success both on the domestic and on the international stage. Levski's academy would become the most successful in national youth competitions for the years to come, and the results were first seen in the likes of Georgi Asparuhov, Georgi Sokolov, Biser Mihaylov, Kiril Ivkov, Ivan Vutsov, Stefan Aladzhov and Aleksandar Kostov, assisted by experienced veterans like Stefan Abadzhiev, Dimo Pechenikov and Hristo Iliev, which resulted in winning the championship in 1965, 1968 and 1970, including the 7–2 triumph over new bitter rivals CSKA Sofia in 1968. In the 1965–66 European Cup, Levski was eliminated in the first round by Benfica with 5–4 on aggregate.

1969–1985: Levski-Spartak
In January 1969, Levski was forcibly merged with Spartak Sofia by the Bulgarian Communist Party, and put under the auspice of the Ministry of Interior Affairs. The name of the club was once again changed, this time to Levski-Spartak.

A new crop of youngsters in the likes of Kiril Milanov, Dobromir Zhechev, Pavel Panov, Stefan Pavlov, Yordan Yordanov, Stefan Staykov, Tomas Lafchis, Todor Barzov, Voyn Voynov, Georgi Tsvetkov, Plamen Nikolov, and Rusi Gochev not only found their place in the first team, but brought new league titles in 1974, 1977, 1979, 1984 and 1985. On the international stage, the team reached the quarter-finals of the European Cup Winners' Cup in 1969–70 and 1976–77, and the quarter-finals of the UEFA Cup in 1975–76. In the latter, Levski defeated Barcelona 5–4 in the second leg, becoming one of the two European teams (alongside Bayern Munich) to have scored five or more goals in one match against Barcelona in official UEFA competitions. Additionally, Levski became the only Bulgarian club to eliminate a German champion after defeating VfB Stuttgart in the first round of the 1984–85 European Cup. They also eliminated Stuttgart a year earlier in the first round of the 1983–84 UEFA Cup.

1985–1989: Vitosha Sofia
The name of the team was changed to Vitosha by the authorities following the disruptions during and after the Bulgarian Cup final in 1985. The game ran on high emotions fuelled by the streak of consecutive victories of Levski over CSKA in the two years prior to the game. During the game, which CSKA won 2–1, there were confrontations both on the field and on the stands. By decree of the Central Committee of the Bulgarian Communist Party, some of the leading players of both clubs were suspended from the sport for life. The championship title of the club for 1985 was suspended. However, the suspensions were lifted shortly after. Levski won another cup and league titles in 1986 and 1988, respectively. The fourth European quarter-final came in 1986–87, when Levski knocked out the 1985–86 Danish Cup winners Boldklubben 1903 and the 1985–86 Yugoslav Cup holders Velež Mostar, before losing to the 1985–86 Copa del Rey winners Real Zaragoza.

1989–2009: Return of Levski Sofia and the Blue Tale
After the 1989–90 season, the club regained its original name. The team was made up of players such as Plamen Nikolov, Petar Hubchev, Tsanko Tsvetanov, Emil Kremenliev, Zlatko Yankov, Georgi Slavchev, Ilian Iliev, Daniel Borimirov, Stanimir Stoilov, Velko Yotov, Plamen Getov, Nikolay Todorov and Nasko Sirakov, and won three consecutive domestic national championships in 1993, 1994 and 1995. Levski contributed seven players (Tsvetanov, Kremenliev, Yankov, Sirakov, Nikolov, Petar Aleksandrov, and Borimirov), more than any other Bulgarian club, to the national team that finished fourth at the 1994 FIFA World Cup.

In 2005–06, Levski reached the quarter-finals of the 2005–06 UEFA Cup after knocking out the 2004–05 Coupe de France winners Auxerre in the first round, finishing above SC Heerenveen, Dinamo București and the reigning title holders CSKA Moscow in the group stage, triumphing over Champions League participants Artmedia Bratislava and Udinese in the knockout stages, before being eliminated by Schalke 04.

Levski, as the champions of Bulgaria, started their 2006–07 UEFA Champions League participation in the second qualifying round, where they eliminated Georgian champions Sioni Bolnisi, defeating them 2–0 both home and away. In the third round, Levski faced the Italian team Chievo Verona, which took part in the tournament because of other clubs' sanctions as part of the 2006 Serie A matchfixing scandal. Levski eliminated Chievo after a decisive 2–0 win in Sofia and a 2–2 draw in Verona, and thus became the first Bulgarian club to ever reach the group stage of the UEFA Champions League. There, they faced the title holders Barcelona, Premier League champions Chelsea, and Werder Bremen. They lost all six games and scored only one goal, in the second round against Chelsea.

Levski's 2005–06 UEFA Cup run and the participation in the Champions League group stage were considered the club's greatest European successes in the 21st century, hence the period in which this happened (2005–2007) was informally called the Blue Tale.

Levski earned a place in the 2008–09 UEFA Champions League after the Bulgarian league champions CSKA Sofia failed to obtain a UEFA license. Levski lost to BATE Borisov of Belarus in the third qualifying round.

2009–2020: Downfall
During the 2009–10 season, Levski's team started their European campaign with a 9–0 (on aggregate) win against UE Sant Julià in the second qualifying round of the 2009–10 UEFA Champions League. In the next round, Levski Sofia faced FK Baku, eliminating the team from Azerbaijan with 2–0 on aggregate. In the play-off round, Levski was eliminated by Debrecen with 4–1 on aggregate. As one of the play-off losers, Levski qualified for the 2009–10 UEFA Europa League. In the group stage, Levski faced Villarreal, Lazio and Red Bull Salzburg. Levski achieved only one win and five defeats. Levski won against Lazio in Italy, after Hristo Yovov scored the winning goal in the match.

Levski started the 2010–11 season with a match against Dundalk, in a second qualifying round of the 2010–11 UEFA Europa League. Levski won the first match . In the return leg at Oriel Park, Levski defeated Dundalk 2–0 with two first half goals from Garra Dembélé. In the next round Levski played against Kalmar FF. The first match ended 1–1 in Sweden. In the return leg in Sofia, Levski won 5–2. In between, The Blues defeated their archrival CSKA Sofia in the Eternal derby with 1–0. Their next match in the Europa League saw them play against AIK Fotboll from Stockholm, Sweden. The first match ended in a goalless draw, and after the game, AIK hooligans attacked the Levski players and staff. The second match ended in a 2–1 home win for Levski. Goals scored by Daniel Mladenov and Garra Dembélé put Levski in the Europa League group stage. Levski was drawn in Group C, facing Gent, Lille and Sporting CP. The first match was played against Gent at home, which Levski won 3–2 with the winning goal scored by Serginho Greene. With this win, Levski recorded eight consecutive games without a defeat in European competitions. After that, Levski lost to Sporting CP with 5–0, followed by another defeat against Lille. In Sofia, Levski played well against Lille and was leading 2–1 until Ivo Ivanov scored an own goal to make it 2–2. In the last match of the Group C, Levski took a win against Sporting CP with 1–0, with the winning goal scored by Daniel Mladenov.

In the following 2011–12 season, in the third qualifying round of the Europa League, Levski were eliminated by Spartak Trnava of Slovakia, following a late game 2–1 win in Sofia, and a loss of the same scoreline in Trnava. The penalty shoot-out costed Levski a place in the play-off round. This caused an upset with the fans and players, and the team barely clinched the fourth place at the winter break in the Bulgarian league. Albeit only three points from the leaders Ludogoretz Razgrad, the acting manager Georgi Ivanov was sacked from the position, but remained at the club as a sporting director. Nikolay Kostov was appointed the new manager of the club, giving the supporters a sense of optimism, which, however, faded after a cup knock-out in the hands of Lokomotiv Plovdiv and a home defeat to Minyor Pernik. Kostov handed in his resignation, leaving the managerial post once again vacant. Sporting director Georgi Ivanov once again stepped in to help the club, and accepted being the manager until the summer break, when a new one would be appointed.

During the summer of 2012, former player Ilian Iliev was appointed the new manager of the club. Under his management, Levski was knocked out from the Europa League by Bosnian side FK Sarajevo. Iliev led the team to 13 league victories and to the semi-finals of the Bulgarian Cup after eliminating Cherno More Varna and Litex Lovech on the away goals rule. Iliev however was sacked after a 1–1 away draw against Pirin Gotse Delchev. Assistant manager Nikolay Mitov took over the team until the end of the season. Under his management Levski won the derby clashes against Litex, CSKA and Ludogorets but failed to win the title after a 1–1 home draw against Slavia Sofia. Levski also reached their first Bulgarian Cup final since 2007, but lost on penalties against Beroe Stara Zagora. Despite the missed opportunity of winning a trophy, Mitov's contract was renewed for the 2013–14 season. However, the team made another disappointing performance in Europa League, being eliminated by the Kazakh side Irtysh Pavlodar. As a result, Nikolay Mitov resigned as manager.

In July 2013 Slaviša Jokanović was appointed as the new manager of the team. Despite losing only two matches in twelve games, Jokanović was released in October 2013. Ivaylo Petev was announced as his successor but during his introduction a few Levski supporters interrupted it, stating that they would not accept his appointment. The next day, Petev refused to take charge of the team and Antoni Zdravkov was named as the new manager. Under his reign the team suffered a heavy 3–0 loss against rivals CSKA, but managed to knock them out in the Bulgarian Cup in December 2013 after penalties. Due to the difficult financial situation, a few key players, such as Antonio Vutov and Garry Rodrigues, were sold to Udinese and Elche, respectively, during the winter break. This reflected on the team's performance and Levski finished fifth and got knocked out in the quarter-finals of the Bulgarian Cup by Botev Plovdiv. Antoni Zdravkov was sacked in March 2014, and Levski legend Elin Topuzakov took charge as a caretaker until the end of the 2013–14 season. The club did not participate in European competitions for the first time since 1990–91.

On 23 May 2014, the club supporters organized a friendly game against Lazio, marking the 100th anniversary of the club. Club icons like Georgi Ivanov, Dimitar Ivankov, Aleksandar Aleksandrov, Hristo Yovov, Elin Topuzakov and many other former players and celebrities took participation by playing in the game, as well as donating money for the event's organization. The next day, Levski marked 100 years since its founding. 

The following years were arguably the darkest in the club's history. League-wise, Levski managed to finish higher than third place only once (runners-up in 2015–16), and achieved its lowest ever ranking (seventh place in 2014–15 and eighth in 2020–21). On the stage of the Bulgarian Cup, the club lost two more finals, in 2015 to Cherno More and in 2018 to Slavia Sofia. In European competitions, Levski faced some of its most embarrassing eliminations – against Liechtenstein side FC Vaduz and Cypriot AEK Larnaca, the latter inflicting the largest ever European defeat on aggregate for Levski .

These years were turbulent not only on the football pitch, but at the higher hierarchy of the club. In June 2015, the long-time president Todor Batkov stepped down and the club was taken over by Ivo Tonev, Aleksandar Angelov and Nikolay Ivanov. From this point onwards, Levski began to experience financial problems. Tonev, Angelov and Ivanov's reign was short-lived and in August 2016, they transferred their shares to businessman Spas Rusev. Under his governance, Levski signed players like Gabriel Obertan and Jordi Gómez, as well as coach Delio Rossi, in an attempt to return the club's glory. However, Rusev's financing was dubious, and there were complaints for delayed wages. In February 2017, Rusev admitted the club was "practically bankrupt". On 9 February 2019, Rusev stepped down as owner of Levski, leaving the club with more than 30 million BGN in debt. Four days later, businessman and former owner of archrivals CSKA Vasil Bozhkov took over the club. He attempted to stabilize Levski's financial situation by immediately covering the most urgent obligations and selling or releasing the players with the highest wages, investing around 25 million BGN in total throughout his tenure. In February 2020, Bozhkov stepped down as his main business, 7777.bg (National Lottery), had its license withdrawn by the Bulgarian government. The club being left with no financing whatsoever and in a full-scale financial crisis, sparkled an unprecedented support campaign amongst the fans, who engaged in various donation initiatives, raising 2.6 million BGN in the span of five months.

In 2021, former owner Vasil Bozhkov admitted that he was forced to take over Levski under the threat of business closure by prime minister Boyko Borisov. Bozhkov's confession was somewhat of a confirmation of the insinuation that the reason behind Levski's financial problems and occasional ownership changes was Borisov's idea of using the club as an instrument for political influence.

2020–present: Return of Sirakov and Stoilov

In the summer of 2020, club legend Nasko Sirakov took charge of the majority of shares and the club made some financial cuts, forcing a big part of the players (mainly foreigners) to leave. Levski also changed its transfer policy, signing mainly Bulgarian and homegrown players with lower salaries, allowing the club to start paying off some of the debt accumulated throughout the years. Sirakov set a target for the club to clear most of the debt by 2023, mostly through sponsorship deals, outgoing transfers, television rights and the fans' financial support.

On 1 September 2021, Sirakov announced the return of the club's most successful manager in the 21st century, also known as the "author" of the Blue Tale, Stanimir Stoilov. At that time, Levski was in 10th place in the league standings with 4 defeats and 2 wins in the first 6 games. With his arrival, Stoilov released three players – Simeon Slavchev, Valeri Bojinov and Hristofor Hubchev, and signed José Córdoba from Etar and Dimitar Kostadinov from Septemvri Sofia. Under his management, the team managed to improve promptly, earning 20 points by the end of the half-season with 5 wins, 5 draws, and 3 defeats. 

On 15 May 2022, Levski won the Bulgarian Cup by defeating its biggest rivals CSKA 1–0 in the final, thus ending the club's longest ever trophyless period (13 years). It was a record 26th cup for the Blues. By winning the cup, the team earned a place in the UEFA Europa Conference League qualifications. In the second qualifying round, they faced PAOK, who reached the quarter-finals of the same competition the previous season. Despite being considered underdogs, Levski managed to eliminate the Greek team 3–1 on aggregate. However, Levski crashed out of the tournament in the third qualifying round after an upsetting home defeat on penalties at the hands of Maltese side Ħamrun Spartans.

Honours

 
  Shared record

European record

Recent seasons

League positions

Key
 G = Games played
 W = Games won
 D = Games drawn
 L = Games lost
 GS = Goals scored
 GA = Goals against
 P = Points

Club symbols

Names and crests

The first club crest was designed by Mircho Kachulev in 1922. Initially in the size of a square with a blue background, it was intentionally written in a stylized letter "Л" (Bulgarian letter "L"; shortened for Levski). The inner space of the letter was filled vertically equally in yellow and red colours. In a later period of time, the Cyrillic letters "С" (Sport) and "К" (club) were added at the top of the square, while the bottom side was inscribed with the name "Sofia". This badge was used by the club until 1949, when it was renamed to Dinamo.

From 1949 to 1956, the emblem of the club was an irregular hexagon filled with vertical red, white, blue and yellow colours, with an inscribed handwritten Cyrillic letter "Д", alongside a five-pointed red star above it and the word "Sofia" underneath.
From 1957 to 1968 the original logo of the club was restored, however the letters C" and "К" were replaced with "Ф" (Athletic) and "Д" (union).

After the merger with Spartak Sofia in 1969, the club crest has been a shield in blue and white with a horizontal red bar above. The shield spawned the letters "Л" and "C", an abbreviation of the new name Levski-Spartak. The football club used this crest until 1985, when it was renamed Vitosha. Vitosha's crest was in the form of a stylized letter "C" surrounding the football in the upper curve of the letter, coloured in blue and white.

In January 1990, the club restored its original name and original logo, and the letters "C" and "K" in the upper corner of the blue square were replaced with the initials "Ф" (football) and "K" (club). However, due to legal issues with the ownership of the rights to the historic crest, the club was forced to change it in 1998, when a brand new shield logo was introduced, entirely in blue. At its centre, an inscription of the letter "Л" was introduced, alongside the year of establishment – 1914. The dome of the shield was labelled "PFC Levski".

After winning the legal dispute for the rights to the historic emblem in 2006, the club decided to use the two different crests simultaneously for a brief period of time. Later that year, the shield crest was replaced by the classic square emblem.

The Cyrillic letter Л (L) is used today as the club's kit crest and on its social media channels.

Club anthem 
The first anthem of Levski was written by renowned Bulgarian poet Dimcho Debelyanov and composed by Lyubomir Pipkov. Since 1999, the club anthem is "Само Левски шампион" (Only Levski, the champion), composed by Stefan Dimitrov.

Players

First team

For recent transfers, see Transfers summer 2022 and Transfers winter 2022–23.

Out on loan

Reserve team

Foreign players
Up to twenty foreign nationals can be registered and given a squad number for the first team in the Bulgarian First League, however only five non-EU/EEA nationals can be used during a match day. Those non-EU/EEA nationals with European ancestry can claim citizenship from the nation their ancestors came from. If players are not of European origin, they can claim Bulgarian citizenship after five years of playing in Bulgaria.

Note: For a complete list of Levski Sofia players, see :Category:PFC Levski Sofia players.

Club officials

Board of Directors

First Team

{| class="wikitable" style="text-align: center"
|-
!colspan="2"|Technical staff
|-
|align=left|Head coach
|align=left| Stanimir Stoilov
|- 
|align=left|Assistant coach
|align=left| Tsanko Tsvetanov
|-
|align=left|Assistant coach
|align=left| Dimitar Telkiyski
|-
|align=left|Assistant coach
|align=left| Todor Simov
|-
|align=left|Goalkeeper coach
|align=left| Bozhidar Mitrev
|-
|align=left|Fitness and conditioning 
|align=left| Mihailo Shejkeroski
|-
|align=left|Club doctor
|align=left| Andrey Perekhod
|-

Youth Academy
{| class="wikitable" style="text-align: center"
|-
!colspan="2"|Technical staff
|-
|align=left|Under-19 Coach
|align=left| Elin Topuzakov
|-
|align=left|Under-17 Coach
|align=left| Dimitar Andonov
|-
|align=left|Under-16 Coach
|align=left| Stoyan Dimov
|-
|align=left|Under-15 Coach
|align=left| Ahmed Hikmet
|-
|align=left|Under-14 Coach
|align=left| Milen Gadzhev
|-
|align=left|Under-13 Coach
|align=left| Georgi Korudzhiev
|-

Youth academy
Levski's youth academy has developed some of the most successful Bulgarian footballers. Notable academy graduates are Georgi Asparuhov, Nasko Sirakov, Bozhidar Iskrenov, Bozhin Laskov, Georgi Sokolov, Asen Peshev, Borislav Mihaylov, Emil Spasov, Nikolay Iliev, Hristo Yovov, Dimitar Ivankov and many others. At the 1994 FIFA World Cup in which Bulgaria reached the semi-finals, the Bulgarian squad included four players which came through Levski's youth system, making it the most represented club in the Bulgarian squad. In 2020, Levski was included in the CIES Football Observatory annual rankings, which ranks the clubs that trained the most players active in 31 top divisions of UEFA member associations. In these countries there were 33 footballers from Levski's youth academy, and Levski was ranked 35th in Europe.

Stadium

Initially, the club did not possess a field of its own and training was held on an empty space called The Hillock (Могилката/Mogilkata), where the National Palace of Culture was built later. In 1924, the Sofia Municipality provided the club with the rights to an empty field on what were then the outskirts of the city, and a decade later the stadium named Levski Field was finally completed. It provided for 10,000 spectators and was regarded as the finest sport facility in the city.

In 1949, the stadium was nationalized and later the Vasil Levski National Stadium was built on the site. The team played in various locations (including the nearby Yunak Stadium) before moving to the "Dinamo" ground, which was located at the site of the modern Spartak swimming complex. In 1961 after districting the team moved to "Suhata Reka" neighborhood. There a new stadium was completed in 1963, renamed in 1990 in honour of Levski's most beloved former player Georgi Asparuhov.

In 1999, the stadium emerged from serious reconstruction for 29,000 spectators. The field measures 105 x 68 metres. However, the team plays most of its important games versus foreign teams on the national stadium "Vasil Levski".
On one occasion the former club president Todor Batkov had demanded that Levski should receive "Rakovski" stadium on loan. The demand was on grounds that the first club stadium was nationalized and Levski had never been repaid.

In October 2012, it was announced that Levski is rebuilding its stadium. The first phase of the planned reconstruction was to be completed in 2014, on the centennial of the club's foundation. As of 2013, the capacity was reduced to 19,000 due to the undergoing reconstruction of the main stand. On 5 July 2013, the first step was made in the construction of the main stand, which has a capacity of 6000 spectators and meets all the requirements of UEFA for the convenience of fans. Contractor of the "blue" building is the leading Bulgarian company in the construction of road infrastructure and other important rehabilitation projects, “Avtomagistrali – Tcherno more” AD. The stadium's main stand was officially opened on 23 April 2016 at a special ceremony. Since 2019, the Museum of Glory of Levski Sofia is also located at the stadium.

Supporters

Historically, Levski Sofia fans gathered in the south stand of the stadium. This tradition is believed to have its roots in the Sofia Derby when Levski fans met before the games at the area close to the south end of the Vasil Levski National Stadium. Due to the orientation of the stadium and the naming conventions of stands at most Bulgarian stadiums, Sector B became synonymous with Levski fans. More recently the fans in Sector B are seen as part of the ultras movement popular in the Balkans. Today Sector B initiates most of the songs, choreography and pyrotechnic displays at Levski games.
Levski supporters are organized by fanclubs, most notably the National Supporters Club which helps and coordinates fans from all around Bulgaria and supports the organization of events. There are also notable groups from Sofia (Sofia-West, South Division, Blue Junta, HD Boys, LSL and more) and other cities across Bulgaria and globally (such as Ultra Varna, Blue Huns Pernik, OCB Veliko Tarnovo, Torcida Kyustendil, Ultras Vidin, Iron Pazardzhik, Youth Brigade 034 Pazardzik, Blue Boys Blagoevgrad, Blue Lads Sliven, Vandals Pleven, Levski Club Dobrich, Ultras Radomir, Ultras Burgas, Levski 1914 Karlovo, Yambol Boys, Levski UK, Levski Chicago and more). Ultras Levski have a long-standing friendship with Lazio fans. According to a study performed for UEFA, Levski is the most popular Bulgarian club and share the sixth position in Europe with Juventus, by percentage of support in its own country (31%).

UEFA & IFFHS rankings

Club coefficients
This is the current 2021–22 UEFA coefficient:

Full list

Club world ranking
These are the IFFHS club's points as of 22 January 2019:	
	
Full list

Shirt sponsors and manufacturers

Club records
As of 2023

 Biggest league win: 10–0 vs Chernomorets Burgas Sofia (3 March 2007) — 2006–07
 Biggest league defeat: 1–6 vs Botev Plovdiv (7 July 1962) — 1961–62
 Biggest cup win: 12–1 vs Knyaz Kiril Sofia — 1940
 Biggest cup defeat: 0–5 vs Spartak Plovdiv — 1961–62 
 Biggest European competition win: 12–2 vs  Reipas Lahti (16 September 1976) — UEFA Cup Winners' Cup, First round 1st leg, 1976–77
 Biggest European competition defeat: 0–5 vs  AZ Alkmaar (4 November 1980) — UEFA Cup, Second round 2nd leg, 1980–81vs  Barcelona (12 September 2006) — UEFA Champions League, Group stage, 2006–07vs  Sporting CP (30 September 2010) — UEFA Europa League, Group stage, 2010–11
 Most consecutive league games unbeaten: 27 — from 10 September 1948 to 13 May 1950
 Most consecutive league games won: 14 — from 3 April 2004 to 19 September 2004
 Most league points in a season:
 3 for win: 79 — 1994–95
 2 for win: 50 — 1969–70, 1971–72
 Most league goals in a season: 96 — 2006–07
 Record league home attendance: 60,000 vs Pirin Blagoevgrad (16 September 1973) — 1973–74
 Record European competition home attendance: 70,000 vs  Barcelona (17 March 1976) — UEFA Cup, Quarter-finals 2nd leg, 1975–76

Player records
As of 19 March 2023.

Most appearances

Most goals scored

Managerial history and notable players

Managers

 Boris Vasilev (1921–23)
 Mihail Borisov (1923–24)
 Boris Vasilev (1924–27)
 Ivan Kachev (1927–32)
 Tsvetan Genev (1932–33)
 Ivan Radoev (1933)
 Georgi Karaivanov (1934)
 Rudolf Löwenfeld (1934–35)
 Ivan Radoev (1936)
 Kiril Yovovich (1936–37)
 Ivan Radoev (1937–38)
 Dimitar Mutafchiev (1938–39)
 Asen Panchev (1939–40)
 Miloš Strużka (1940–41)
 Asen Panchev (1941–44)
 Ivan Radoev (1944–48)
 Rezső Somlai (1948–49)
 Ivan Radoev (1950–51)
 Liubomir Petrov (1952)
 Dimitar Mutafchiev (1953)
 Vasil Spasov (1954–56)
 Georgi Pachedzhiev (1956–60)
 Kotse Georgiev (1960–61)
 Krastio Chakarov (1961–64)
 Hristo Mladenov (1964–65)
 Rudolf Vytlačil (1965–66)
 Krastyo Chakarov (1966–69)
 Vasil Spasov (1969)
 Rudolf Vytlačil (1969–70)
 Yoncho Arsov (1971–73)
 Dimitar Doychinov (1973–75)
 Ivan Vutsov (1975–76)
 Vasil Spasov (1976–77)
 Ivan Vutsov (1977–80)
 Hristo Mladenov (1980–82)
 Dobromir Zhechev (1982–83)
 Vasil Metodiev (1983–85)
 Kiril Ivkov (1985–87)
 Pavel Panov (1986–87)
 Vasil Metodiev (1988–89)
 Dobromir Zhechev (1989)
 Pavel Panov (1989–90)
 Vasil Metodiev (1991)
 Dinko Dermendzhiev (1991)
 Ivan Vutov (1992–93)
 Georgi Vasilev (1993–95)
 Ivan Kyuchukov (1995–96)
 Georgi Tsvetkov (1996–97)
 Stefan Grozdanov (1997)
 Mihail Valchev (1998)
 Vyacheslav Hrozny (1998)
 Angel Stankov (1999)
 Ljupko Petrović (1999–00)
 Dimitar Dimitrov (2000)
 Vladimir Fedotov (2000)
 Ljupko Petrović (2000–01)
 Georgi Todorov (2001)
 Rüdiger Abramczik (2002)
 Slavoljub Muslin (2002–03)
 Georgi Todorov (2003)
 Georgi Vasilev (2003–04)
 Stanimir Stoilov (1 June 2004 – 6 May 2008)
 Velislav Vutsov (2008)
 Emil Velev (16 August 2008 – 23 July 2009)
 Ratko Dostanić (23 July 2009 – 19 October 2009)
 Georgi Ivanov (19 October 2009 – 30 June 2010)
 Antoni Zdravkov (2009–10)
 Yasen Petrov (1 July 2010 – 28 May 2011)
 Georgi Ivanov (1 June 2011 – 3 November 2011)
 Antoni Zdravkov (2011)
 Nikolay Kostov (3 November 2011 – 27 March 2012)
 Georgi Ivanov (interim) (27 March 2012 – 8 April 2012)
 Yasen Petrov (7 April 2012 – 30 May 2012)
 Ilian Iliev (1 July 2012 – April 2013)
 Nikolay Mitov (12 April 2013 – 12 July 2013)
 Slaviša Jokanović (15 July 2013 – October 2013)
 Ivaylo Petev  (8 October 2013 – 9 October 2013)
 Antoni Zdravkov (10 October 2013 – 19 March 2014)
 Elin Topuzakov (20 March 2014 – June 2014)
 José Murcia (June 2014 – 4 August 2014)
 Georgi Ivanov (4 August 2014 – 22 December 2014)
 Stoycho Stoev (22 December 2014 – 15 May 2016)
 Ljupko Petrović (16 May 2016 – 22 October 2016)
 Elin Topuzakov  (22 October 2016 – 2 March 2017)
 Nikolay Mitov (2 March 2017 – 4 August 2017)
 Delio Rossi (4 August 2017 – 25 July 2018)
 Todor Simov (interim) (25 July 2018 – 31 July 2018)
 Slaviša Stojanovič (31 July 2018 – 21 January 2019)
 Georgi Dermendzhiev (21 January 2019 – 29 April 2019) 
 Georgi Todorov (interim) (29 April 2019 – 30 May 2019)
 Petar Hubchev (30 May 2019 – 11 June 2020)
 Georgi Todorov (11 June 2020 – 24 October 2020)
 Zhivko Milanov (interim) (24 October 2020 – 9 November 2020)
 Slaviša Stojanovič (10 November 2020 – 23 May 2021)
 Zhivko Milanov (2021)
 Todor Simov (interim) (2021)
 Stanimir Stoilov (2 September 2021 – present)

Notable Bulgarian players
Players with at least one appearance for the Bulgarian national team.

 Kiril Yovovich
 Konstantin Maznikov
 Geno Mateev
 Tsvetan Genev
 Dimitar Mutafchiev
 Nikola Mutafchiev
 Ivan Radoev
 Aleksandar Hristov
 Mihail Lozanov
 Asen Panchev
 Asen Peshev
 Bozhin Laskov
 Amedeo Kleva
 Vasil Spasov
 Georgi Pachedzhiev
 Yordan Tomov
 Lyubomir Hranov
 Apostol Sokolov
 Stefan Abadzhiev
 Yoncho Arsov
 Hristo Iliev
 Boris Apostolov
 Dimitar Yordanov
 Aleksandar Kostov
 Georgi Sokolov
 Stefan Aladzhov
 Georgi Asparuhov
 Tsvetan Veselinov
 Ivan Vutsov
 Georgi Kamenski
 Yanko Kirilov 
 Nikola Kotkov
 Biser Mihaylov
 Mihail Gyonin
 Todor Barzov
 Krasimir Borisov
 Voyn Voynov
 Milko Gaydarski
 Georgi Tsvetkov
 Dobromir Zhechev
 Kiril Ivkov
 Kiril Milanov
 Vasil Mitkov
 Pavel Panov
 Emil Spasov
 Stefan Staykov
 Ivan Stoyanov
 Emil Velev
 Mihail Valchev
 Rusi Gochev
 Nikolay Iliev
 Bozhidar Iskrenov
 Krasimir Koev
 Petar Kurdov
 Borislav Mihaylov
 Plamen Nikolov
 Petar Petrov
 Nasko Sirakov
 Georgi Slavchev
 Georgi Yordanov
 Plamen Getov
 Georgi Donkov
 Velko Yotov
 Aleksandar Aleksandrov
 Daniel Borimirov
 Ilian Iliev
 Emil Kremenliev
 Zdravko Zdravkov
 Plamen Nikolov
 Petar Mihtarski
 Petar Aleksandrov
 Tsanko Tsvetanov
 Zlatko Yankov
 Petar Hubchev
 Georgi Ivanov
 Nikolay Todorov
 Marian Hristov
 Stanimir Stoilov
 Predrag Pažin
 Elin Topuzakov
 Dimitar Telkiyski
 Hristo Yovov
 Lúcio Wagner
 Igor Tomašić
 Georgi Ivanov
 Emil Angelov
 Stanislav Angelov
 Nikolay Dimitrov
 Vladimir Gadzhev
 Valeri Domovchiyski
 Dimitar Ivankov
 Milan Koprivarov
 Zhivko Milanov
 Nikolay Mihaylov
 Mariyan Ognyanov
 Georgi Petkov
 Ilian Stoyanov
 Georgi Markov
 Ivan Tsvetkov
 Georgi Chilikov
 Zahari Sirakov
 Plamen Iliev
 Veselin Minev
 Stanislav Kostov
 Valeri Bojinov

Notable foreign players
Foreign players with at least 30 games for the club or that were internationally capped. Players who were internationally capped for their country are listed in bold.

Europe
 Dalibor Dragić
 David Jablonský
 Cédric Bardon
 Gabriel Obertan
 Péter Kabát
 Hólmar Örn Eyjólfsson
 Milan Mijatović
 Serginho Greene
 Nigel Robertha
 Darko Tasevski
 Cristóvão Ramos
 João Silva
 Nuno Reis
 Sergiu Buș
 Konstantin Golovskoy
 John Inglis
 Miloš Cvetković

 Bojan Jorgačević
 Miodrag Pantelić
 Saša Simonović
 Roman Procházka
 Rene Mihelič
 Añete
 Jordi Gómez
 Miguel Bedoya
 Simon Sandberg
 Davide Mariani
North and Central America
 Dustley Mulder
South America
 Zé Soares
 Joãozinho
 Paulinho
 Jean Deza

Africa
 Cédric Hountondji
 Garry Rodrigues
 Basile de Carvalho
 Serge Yoffou
 Garra Dembélé
 Chakib Benzoukane
 Mehdi Bourabia
 Youssef Rabeh
 Garba Lawal
 Omonigho Temile
 Justice Christopher
 Richard Eromoigbe
 Ekundayo Jayeoba
 Tunde Adeniji
 Khaly Thiam
 Ricardo Nunes

Bulgarian Footballer of the Year

 1931 –  Asen Peshev
 1942 –  Lyuben Stamboliev
 1948 –  Vasil Spasov
 1965 –  Georgi Asparuhov
 1970 –  Stefan Aladzhov
 1974 –  Kiril Ivkov
 1975 –  Kiril Ivkov
 1977 –  Pavel Panov
 1984 –  Plamen Nikolov
 1986 –  Borislav Mihaylov
 1987 –  Nikolay Iliev
 1999 –  Aleksandar Aleksandrov
 2000 –  Georgi Ivanov
 2001 –  Georgi Ivanov

A Group top goalscorers

 1940 –  Yanko Stoyanov (14 goals)
 1950 –  Lubomir Hranov (11 goals)
 1957 –  Hristo Iliev (14 goals)
 1960 –  Dimitar Yordanov (12 goals)
 1965 –  Georgi Asparuhov (27 goals)
 1974 –  Kiril Milanov (19 goals)
 1976 –  Pavel Panov (18 goals)
 1977 –  Pavel Panov (20 goals)
 1979 –  Rusi Gochev (19 goals)
 1982 –  Mihail Valchev (24 goals)
 1984 –  Emil Spasov (19 goals)
 1987 –  Nasko Sirakov (36 goals)
 1988 –  Nasko Sirakov (28 goals)
 1992 –  Nasko Sirakov (26 goals)
 1993 –  Plamen Getov (26 goals)
 1994 –  Nasko Sirakov (30 goals)
 2001 –  Georgi Ivanov (21 goals)
 2003 –  Georgi Chilikov (22 goals)
 2011 –  Garra Dembele (26 goals)
 2013 –  Basile de Carvalho (19 goals)
 2015 –  Añete (14 goals)
 2019 –  Stanislav Kostov (24 goals)

See also
 Levski Sofia (sports club)
 Bulgarian Footballer of the Year
 ECA and EMCA

References

External links

Official websites
  
 Levski Academy 
 UEFA Profile

Fan websites
 Sector B website 
 Levski Sofia – statistics 

 
Association football clubs established in 1914
1914 establishments in Bulgaria
Football clubs in Sofia